The meridian 148° west of Greenwich is a line of longitude that extends from the North Pole across the Arctic Ocean, North America, the Pacific Ocean, the Southern Ocean, and Antarctica to the South Pole.

The 148th meridian west forms a great circle with the 32nd meridian east.

From Pole to Pole
Starting at the North Pole and heading south to the South Pole, the 148th meridian west passes through:

{| class="wikitable plainrowheaders"
! scope="col" width="130" | Co-ordinates
! scope="col" | Country, territory or sea
! scope="col" | Notes
|-
| style="background:#b0e0e6;" | 
! scope="row" style="background:#b0e0e6;" | Arctic Ocean
| style="background:#b0e0e6;" |
|-valign="top"
| style="background:#b0e0e6;" | 
! scope="row" style="background:#b0e0e6;" | Beaufort Sea
| style="background:#b0e0e6;" | Passing just west of Cross Island, Alaska,  (at )
|-valign="top"
| 
! scope="row" | 
| Alaska — Mainland, Esther Island, Perry Island, the mainland again, Chenega Island, Evans Island and Latouche Island
|-valign="top"
| style="background:#b0e0e6;" | 
! scope="row" style="background:#b0e0e6;" | Pacific Ocean
| style="background:#b0e0e6;" | Passing just west of Montague Island, Alaska,  (at ) Passing just east of Tikehau atoll,  (at ) Passing just west of Rangiroa atoll,  (at ) Passing just east of Mehetia island,  (at )
|-
| style="background:#b0e0e6;" | 
! scope="row" style="background:#b0e0e6;" | Southern Ocean
| style="background:#b0e0e6;" |
|-
| 
! scope="row" | Antarctica
| Unclaimed territory
|-
|}

See also
147th meridian west
149th meridian west

w148 meridian west